The Sporting de Gijón youth teams are integrated in the club's youth academy, developing players from childhood through to the integration of the best prospects into the adult teams.

The final category within the youth structure is the Juvenil A under-18/19 team which represents the club in the top national competition. The successful graduates then usually move to the club's reserve team, Sporting de Gijón B which is also considered part of the cantera due to being a stage in progression towards the senior team, albeit competing in the adult league system.

The academy is based at the club training complex, Escuela de Fútbol de Mareo, which is often the name used informally to refer to the system itself.

Background
The top football clubs in the Spanish leagues generally place great importance in developing their cantera to promote the players from within or sell to other clubs as a source of revenue, and Sporting de Gijón is no exception. Their youth recruitment network is focused around their home region of Asturias, and there are collaboration agreements in place with small clubs in the region.

Sporting de Gijón had many farm teams, like RD Oriamendi, until his official reserve team, Sporting de Gijón B, was established in 1960.

Sporting's academy, the Escuela de Fútbol de Mareo, built in 1974, is considered one of the most important football academies in Spain. International players such as Luis Enrique, Abelardo, Javier Manjarín and David Villa learned their skills at Mareo.

In 2010, Sporting youth graduate Míchel was sold to Birmingham City for £3 million, becoming the highest transfers in the history of the Asturian club, until the transfers of José Ángel to Roma, in 2011, by €4.5 million, and Jorge Meré to Köln, in 2017, for a fee between €8.5 million and €9 million.

Structure

Head coaches
The coaches are often former Sporting Gijón players who themselves graduated from Mareo.

Current squads

Juvenil A

Season to season (Juvenil A)

Honours

National competitions

 División de Honor (Group I): (first-tier inter-regional league)
4 2003–04, 2004–05, 2011–12, 2017–18
 Copa de Campeones:
1 2004 (runners-up: 2005, 2018)
 Copa del Rey:
 0 (runners-up: 2005)

References

External links
Official website

Sporting de Gijón
Football academies in Spain
División de Honor Juvenil de Fútbol